CP3 or CP-3 may refer to:

People 
 Chris Paul (born 1985), American basketball player for the Phoenix Suns; head of the CP3 Foundation
 Candace Parker (born 1986), American basketball player for the Chicago Sky

Other uses 
 CP3 (classification), a disability sport classification specific to cerebral palsy
 Child's Play 3, a 1991 American horror film
 Chicago Pile-3, the world's first heavy water reactor
 Complex projective space, in mathematics
 Mercury-manganese star, a class of chemically peculiar stars
 CP3: an EEG electrode site according to the 10–20 system (EEG)
 Riviera MRT/LRT station, MRT station code CP3